Black Lagoon (stylized in all caps) is a Japanese anime television series based on the manga series of the same title by Rei Hiroe. The series was produced by Madhouse, Geneon Entertainment and Shogakukan and directed and written by Sunao Katabuchi, with Masanori Shino designing the characters and Edison composing the music. The first season was broadcast in Japan from April to June 2006; it was followed by a second season, titled The Second Barrage, broadcast from October to December of the same year. A five-episode original video animation (OVA), subtitled Roberta's Blood Trail, was launched from July 2010 to June 2011. In North America, the anime series was originally licensed by Geneon Entertainment in 2006 and was later acquired by Funimation in 2008, who also licensed the OVA and released it in 2013.

Plot

Set during the mid-1990s, Rokuro "Rock" Okajima is a 25-year-old Japanese salaryman working for Asahi Industries in Tokyo. One day, he is taken hostage by the crew of the Elco-type PT boat Black Lagoon, the Lagoon Company, a group of pirate mercenaries dedicated to smuggling goods in and around the seas of Southeast Asia. The group is composed by Dutch, the African-American leader and a former U.S. Navy patrol boat crewman; Revy, the Chinese-American main gunfighter of the team; and Benny, a Jewish-American college dropout, who serves as the mechanic, computer specialist, and researcher.

After his department chief abandons Rock, declaring him dead, he decides to join the crew. Despite living now as a pirate, Rock retains his skills and good-natured attitude, serving the team as their negotiator and "professional" face of the group. The crew's base of operations is located in the fictional town of Roanapur, Thailand, which is home to pirates, thieves and various criminal organizations, including the Japanese yakuza, the Chinese triad, the Russian and Italian mafias and the Colombian cartel. The Lagoon Company takes on a variety of missions, which generally involve violent gunfights and wars with all kind of criminals.

Production
The series director, Sunao Katabuchi, stated he was a fan of the original manga before making the adaptation, expressing that he was attracted by its energy and dynamism. Katabuchi said that he liked to read American novels, and when he started reading Black Lagoon, he thought that the author, Rei Hiroe, must also have liked them. Katabuchi previously directed the family-oriented film Princess Arete, and commented that there was not much difference in working on an older-audiences series like Black Lagoon, stating that he rather tried to create something that is intended for the individual, as it says something different to each person independently. Katabuchi commented that when he met Hiroe, they talked about Stephen King and the genre of American gothic horror. As they both also liked action novels, Katabuchi said: "it was clear that Mr. Hiroe and I had many things in common," claiming that up until that point, he was making things like Princess Arete, and he hoped to make something like Black Lagoon.

Hiroe said that when the anime television series was announced, there was time taken to do some cross referencing between him and the producers, but that he had no major involvement in its development, leaving to Katabuchi and his staff to figure things out, so his schedule for the manga was not affected by it. Hiroe commented that he wanted the spirit of the series to be preserved, but that he did not want to interfere with the director's vision.

Katabuchi commented that the violence of the original manga did not have to be toned down, adding that there was "no intention of being discreet." Ryoichiro Matsuo, the animation producer, was told to emphasize the gruesome descriptions, with Katabuchi expressing that the parts he worked on "even smelled bloody." Katabuchi said that along with various meanings, there may be differences in the image quality, so he gathered the staff and together they envisioned the same episode to keep everyone on the same page.

Katabuchi commented about the changes he made from the original manga, mentioning that, for example, when the Lagoon company crew are salvaging an U-boat, he wondered: "what kind of drama took place for the people who rode the U-Boat back in 1945?" adding that it was considerable in scale and so he put that in. Other example is when Roberta is following the Lagoon crew. Katabuchi commented that in the planning stages with Hiroe, he talked about how he wanted to add a car chase in the original scene. The staff considered a fight between Revy and Roberta, but Katabuchi wanted to see Dutch take on Roberta, so they created that situation. In the last part of the Hansel and Gretel twins arc, there is a scene where Rock embraces Gretel, the female twin. The twins are actually people with multiple personalities, who cross-dress each other, "as there's a boy and a girl inside each of them." Katabuchi added the scene to show that, "by embracing one of the twins, [Rock] embraced both of them," and this would display Rock's compassion more than the manga. Katabuchi considered this storyline as his favorite, but commented that they were worried at first due to its cruelty, wondering if a casual viewer would want to watch it.

Hiroe claimed that he knew that the adaptation would contradict his original story, but added that Katabuchi was given the freedom to rewrite it however he wanted, expressing that he had an "extremely polished technique for making my story concise and easy to understand," and that he handled all of this very well. Hiroe said that Katabuchi was able to relate some points in the story that he did not have the opportunity to tell in the manga. He also declared that the dialogues were the "biggest upheaval," adding that, while the content was the same, the performance brought a "palpable emotion," which did not necessarily coincide with his own interpretation, and he only noticed it when he watched the series on television.

Katabuchi said that the scene when Roberta's umbrella opens up and spins around the body and fires was his favorite. The staff in charge of that scene called it "The Evil Mary Poppins," and Katabuchi commented that Hiroe originally also had the idea to use the character as a kind of "Death Poppins," noting how the name given by the staff and Hiroe's original idea synchronized.

To animate the real-word firearms and other weapons, Katabuchi commented that they did not have real guns of any type, but that they did hear from people who had actually shot one. Without shooting a bullet, they would borrow a gun and guess the feel and weight of it. He added that they did a lot of research on the U-boat, stating that the one featured in the series is "even more realistic than [one] featured in a war movie." Since the series takes place at the end of the 20th century, "in 1995 or 1996," Katabuchi discussed about how during that time period, the collapse of the Soviet Union caused instabilities everywhere, and how within the unrest, Balalaika and the Russian mafia and Rock's group play a part in this period; "[t]hey live in the last part of the century, so I thought it would be a memorable time."

Following the conclusion of The Second Barrage, Katabuchi commented that he wanted to make more of the series, but stated that it is the kind of story where everything must be individually researched and that is "very-time consuming," noting that despite seeming that each episode spring forth one after another, Hiroe developed the ideas for a long time and the research piled up. Katabuchi stated that they did not have the means to make more episodes at the time. Katabuchi then said that for his next project he wanted to make something that children would like, and after that, he would go back to do something like Black Lagoon; "I want to return to that kind of world."

Release

The series, which adapted eight story arcs from the original manga, was produced by Madhouse, Geneon Entertainment and Shogakukan and directed and written by Katabuchi, with Masanori Shino designing the characters and Edison composing the music. The series was broadcast for twelve episodes on Chiba TV (and on other fifteen terrestrial stations) from April 9 to June 25, 2006. A second season, Black Lagoon: The Second Barrage, consisting of twelve more episodes, ran for the first time on Sendai Television from October 3 to December 19, 2006.

The first season was released on six DVDs, each containing two episodes, from July 26 to December 27, 2006. The second season mirrored this, being released from January 31 to July 27, 2007. Both seasons were re-released on a total of eight Blu-ray Disc sets: the first season was released on four sets from December 23, 2009, to February 10, 2010; the second season was released on four sets from February 24 to March 25, 2010. The Blu-ray Disc releases of both seasons included seven short comical omake specials produced from 2009 to 2010.

A five-episode original video animation (OVA), titled Black Lagoon: Roberta's Blood Trail, which covered the El Baile de la Muerte arc of the manga, was released from July 17, 2010, to June 22, 2011.

International release
In North America, Geneon Entertainment announced the license to the series in July 2006. Geneon's North American dub was released on three DVD compilations, each containing four episodes, between May 22 and September 18, 2007.  In September 2007, Geneon announced that they had ceased in-house distribution of its series. Geneon USA's English dub premiered on G4techTV Canada as part of its Anime Current block on October 26, 2007, and Starz Edge as part of its Animidnight late programming block, began airing it on February 26, 2008. The Second Barrage premiered on G4techTV Canada on January 18, 2008.

On July 3, 2008, Geneon and Funimation announced an agreement to distribute select titles in North America. While Geneon would still retain the license, Funimation would assume exclusive rights to the manufacturing, marketing, sales and distribution of select titles. Black Lagoon was one of several titles involved in the deal. A box set of the entire first season was released on December 30, 2008. The Second Barrage was released on three DVDs from August 19 to October 28, 2008. At Anime Expo 2010, Funimation announced their licensing of the Roberta's Blood Trail OVA, which was later released on August 6, 2013. The first and second seasons were re-released on a Blu-ray Disc/DVD combo pack on December 4, 2012. Black Lagoon returned to American television on the Funimation Channel on February 15, 2013. The series began airing in Adult Swim's Toonami block on March 23, 2014. A Blu-ray collection of all 29 episodes was released on June 4, 2019. Following Sony's acquisition of Crunchyroll, the English dub edition was moved over to Crunchyroll.

In the United Kingdom, the series was licensed by Kazé UK, which released the television series on two Blu-ray sets in July 2012, and the OVA in November 2013. In November 2020, Anime Limited announced that they had licensed the television series and the OVA, and they released it on November 29, 2021.

Music
The original soundtrack album was released on August 30, 2006. The opening theme is "Red Fraction" by Mell and the ending theme is "Don't Look Behind" by Edison. Episode 15 features the ending theme "The World of Midnight" by Minako "mooki" Obata, and episode 24 features the ending theme "Peach Headz Addiction" by Breath Frequency. The original soundtrack for the Roberta's Blood Trail OVA was included with the limited edition of the first Blu-ray Disc set, released on July 27, 2010. The opening theme for Roberta's Blood Trail is a remixed version of "Red Fraction", titled "Red Fraction (IO Drive Mix)", while the ending theme is an instrumental version of the American Civil War song "When Johnny Comes Marching Home". The last episode ending theme is "This moment 〜prayer in the light〜" by Minako "mooki" Obata.

Reception

First season
In a review of the first DVD release, Tom Flinn of ICv2 called the series "an earthbound Cowboy Bebop," adding that like in said series, "the action never flags in Black Lagoon," concluding that it "deliver[s] the "action picture" goods, and while it's not for every one, this anime rocks hard and should find considerable success here in North America." Tasha Robinson of Sci Fi Weekly also compared the series to Cowboy Bebop, noting similarities between the characters, dynamic, "edgy animation" and "intrusive presence of jazzy music." Robinson discussed the ambiguous morality of the series, noting that it "doesn't even hesitate to show innocent bystanders caught in the crossfire," but that "collateral damage and incidental death aren't as important as the cash-focused adventures of the series' antiheroes." Robinson commented that "relatively little happens in the first three episodes," adding that it is "one of those series that's best watched several discs at a time." Serdar Yegulalp of About.com commented that its attention to character and morality is what set it "much further apart from its competitors," stating, however, that the violence is the "sort of endurance-testing sadism that might make some audiences reach for either the smelling salts or the STOP button." Yegulalp concluded: "[f]or a show that comes on like a violence-and-vulgarity vending machine, it's downright surprising how much deeper and more nuanced it becomes the more you stick with it." Katherine Luther, of the same website, called it a "freaky, freaky show," "fast-moving and in-your-face from the start," and "hard, crass and blatantly brutal," but Luther expressed that she "didn't move from the couch."

Theron Martin of Anime News Network (ANN), in comparing the series to Cowboy Bebop, commented that while that series had a "laid-back style regularly punctuated by intense action, casual philosophizing, and the occasional quirky or poignant moment," Black Lagoon "strives for pure 'tude," adding that it has "all the elements it needs to be a big hit – sexy heroine, loads of coarse language and graphic violence, great visuals, and a kickin' musical score." Martin, however, questioned whether or not it would success in North America due to its "distinct step outside of the normal anime style and closer in spirit to an American action serial." Writing for Newtype USA, David F. Smith said that the series has "a lot of dark humor, and the show even has the guts to take itself seriously from time to time," and that it features "some pretty clever plotting, complete with dialogue smarter than it has any right to be," but commented that the action animation "skimp[s] on the writing," concluding: "any action fan better not miss the boat." Mark Thomas of Mania.com commented that while he found the premise of the series "interesting, but nothing truly special", he was not expecting "some really fantastic dark humor mixed with fairly deep morality issues," noting as well that the relationship between Rock and Revy is what "really drives the series." Thomas concluded: "With its content, it is obviously not a series for everybody, as it is unapologetic about its gore and confrontations, but if none of that bothers you, then this is a must-see. Highly recommended."

Joseph Luster of Otaku USA praised the series for its characters, action scenes and for its format in general, commenting that the way each episode ends, fading to the "somber end theme that plays over Revy’s zombie-like destructive shamble across the sand," is "a very melancholy way to close out what is typically frenetic and over the top." Luster stated that the series "isn’t perfect by any means, but it’s incredibly consistent and fast-paced." Reviewing the first DVD volume, Chris Beveridge of AnimeOnDVD (later Mania.com) said that, while "nothing terribly original yet," he enjoyed the series, adding that it "doesn't cringe from violence and has enough hooks to it that lets it work," concluding: "Black Lagoon simply kicks ass. Very recommended." Bradley Meek of THEM Anime Reviews said that the series "borrows copious amounts of the attitude, look and feel of Hollywood, and is as cool as any cartoon ever was." Meek commented that the animation, scripts and directing are "consistent from beginning to end," and called Revy and Rock's relationship the "emotional crux of the series," praising as well their development.

The Second Barrage
Katherine Luther commented that the second season is less focused on character development than the first one, and that instead, it turns the focus to the "bizarre array of jobs the Lagoon Company takes," also calling it "considerably darker than the first season," but that still contains "plenty of suspenseful and shocking action scenes," calling it as well "the best anime entertainment I've seen in a while." Davey C. Jones of Active Anime expressed: "if you thought the first season was unforgettable, hold onto your hats! The ride gets even wilder and deadlier in season two!" praising the story arcs, characters and actions scenes. Jones concluded: "The story gets bleaker as the show goes along. It is unforgiving and unflinching in every way. Damn, this show is great!" Sandra Scholes, of the same website, called the series "energetic and  violent with gangs either out for revenge or on the lookout for easy money leaving the viewer wondering what will happen next in the series as it progresses," adding that the second season "subjects you to hours of blasting entertainment guaranteed to keep you watching right 'till the end." Bryce Coulter of Mania.com commented that the season "carries the same great traits that made the first season so successful," and that the series "literally barrages you with some heavy action and heavy plot development."

Reviewing the first DVD of the season, Theron Martin stated: "those with a high tolerance for blood-soaked violence and off-kilter humor should find a lot to like here." Martin commented about the storyline of the twins Hänsel and Gretel (episodes 13–15), pointing out that despite their backgrounds, they "engender no pity or sympathy" until the second half of episode 15, adding that "only the most hardened hearts will not feel at least a little sorry for them as the credits conclude." He praised the writing, visuals of these episodes and the English dub. Also reviewing the first DVD volume, Holly Ellingwood of Active Anime called the twins' story arc "more graphic violently and grim, even bleak, compared to the more high octane episodes of the previous season," and that it takes "some unexpected turns in its final moments, revealing unsettling character depths and poignancy," ultimately calling the volume "[a] thrill every second!" Reviewing the same DVD volume, Tasha Robinson said that it is "so messy […] that it feels like watching a cut of Kill Bill with no Bride to root for." Robinson commented that while the early episodes of the first season were "a little talky and convoluted", the second season "kicks off in breathless style", adding that it is "more than a little disturbing, but it's a solid adrenaline rush nonetheless." Christoper Homer of Mania.com called the twins' story arc "truly disturbing and yet stunning," and said that the relationship between Revy and Rock in the season is "absolutely fantastic." Homer concluded that the show is "very entertaining, enthralling and at times, downright disturbing."

Reviewing the second DVD volume, Homer said that The Second Barrage "expands from the first season and gets even better," praising the development of Revy and Rock, and stating that the series "has always been good based on the strength of  characters,  action and  vocal and visual work." Reviewing the third and final DVD of the season, Chris Beveridge called the final storyline, featuring the characters of Ginji and Yukio, "a really solid ride," commenting that the "intellectual side of the series during these episodes is great to watch," and that this volume adds "another pair of discussions that really make [Revy and Rock] feel even more real and complicated." Also reviewing the third DVD, Ellingwood wrote: "[i]t’s an action series Hell-bent on bloodshed of all kinds but also bleeding emotional collateral as well," stating that the volume includes the "hardest hitting moments of the series" and that the last episodes are "as stunning in character study as they are riveting in their gunfights," ultimately calling the conclusion "unforgettable." Reviewing the same volume for IGN, David F. Smith commented that The Second Barrage "doesn't go out with quite the bang it deserves." Smith said that in the final storyline there are times were the plot is "very obviously running in place," adding that there is a point where it "suddenly stops, chases its tail for a while, and then darts off in a random direction," calling its ending "disappointing" and that the DVD is "the weakest volume of the series as a whole."

Roberta's Blood Trail
Serdar Yegulalp of About.com commented that the OVA is more "absurdly over-the-top" than the television series, adding that Roberta being "just about unkillable" became "something of a running joke." Yegulalp, however, said that the series is "anything but mindless," adding that it is "loaded with violence, depravity, and thoroughly unlikable characters," but "assembled and presented with keen insight for everyone involved," and that the series has "always been skilled at creating, and demolishing, sympathy for both "good" and "bad" guys." Holly Ellingwood of Active Anime said that the arc was her favorite from the manga and praised the way Madhouse handled the adaptation. Ellingwood, however, commented that the scene of Roberta going against the military for the first blow was too short, and the scenes of her mental state and hallucinations went on too long, but added that the criticism is "minor compared to the strength of the overall story."

Ard Vijn of Screen Anarchy commended the OVA, stating that it is a "homage to action films, a parody of action films, and a damn good action film, while staying consistent and true to itself," concluding that the OVA cements the status of Black Lagoon as one of the best contemporary action anime. Writing for The Fandom Post, Christopher Homer made a positive review of the OVA, praising the story and character development, also stating that it is "both action packed and thought provoking." Homer, however, lamented that some characters like Dutch, Benny and Balalaika, did not have enough airtime in the OVA. Theron Martin of Anime News Network noted that the OVA is more violent and graphic that the television series, which was already "hardly tame to begin with." Martin also praised the character development of Rock, Revy and Roberta. However, he commented that, while in the TV series the philosophical dialogues did not get in the way of the story, in the OVA gets "carried away with the allusions it tries to draw," calling it a distraction to the story. Martin concluded that the OVA is "a worthy continuation of the franchise."

References

Further reading

External links
 
 
 

  
 
 

Black Lagoon
2006 anime television series debuts
2010 anime OVAs
Anime series based on manga
Crunchyroll anime
Dark comedy anime and manga
Fiction set in the 1990s
Geneon USA
Girls with guns anime and manga
Madhouse (company)
NBCUniversal Entertainment Japan
Organized crime in anime and manga
Pirates in anime and manga
Terrorism in fiction
Thailand in fiction
Thriller anime and manga
Toonami
Triad (organized crime)
Works about Colombian drug cartels
Works about the Russian Mafia
Yakuza in anime and manga